Selat Panjang is the capital of Kepulauan Meranti Regency, which is part of the province of Riau in Indonesia. The regency is a new regency in Riau province which was established in 2009 after being separated from Bengkalis Regency. The city is located on Tebing Tinggi Island, which is separated by a narrow channel from Sumatra, and across the Strait of Malacca from Singapore.

People

Selat Panjang has a dense population of about 120,000 people. The largest ethnic group is Chinese, and almost all of them adhere to Buddhism and Taoism. Around 37% of the population are ethnic Malay. There are also smaller ethnic groups such as Tamils, Minangkabau and Javanese.

Thus, nowadays many Chinese Indonesians that are originally from Selat Panjang have moved to other regions in order to make a better living at prominent locations like Medan, Pekanbaru, Batam, Bengkalis and Tanjung Balai Karimun. Nevertheless, during every Chinese New Year, many of them would return back to Selat Panjang in order to celebrate the Chinese New Year with their kins and relatives although they have migrated to other regions or cities for many years.

Language
Bahasa Indonesia is primarily spoken by people in Selatpanjang. Beside that, Riau Malay is used as a lingua franca while the local Chinese population speaks a form of Hokkien language known as Riau Hokkien (廖内福建话). This form of Hokkien is very similar to Singaporean Hokkien and Southern Malaysian Hokkien in terms of accent as well as lexicon. Riau Hokkien is spoken in the middle and southern part of the Indonesian island of Sumatra and is very different from Medan Hokkien which is used in the northern part of the Sumatra island.

Climate & Environment
The land is flat. At one time it was entirely covered by peat swamps and dense forest, but it is rapidly being cleared for pulpwood and palm oil plantations. Mudskippers thrive in the tidal flats. Lake Nambus is about 30 minutes by road from the port of Selat Panjang, near Tanjung Village, surrounded by protected forest. During the month of Safar local people swim in the lake.

History of the City 

The city of Selat Panjang is the administrative seat of the Meranti Islands Regency. It used to be one of the city(Bandar) are the most busy and popular trade in the Sultanate of Siak. since the first Bandar has formed a heterogeneous society, especially the Malays and Chinese, because they are the role of inter- formed closely in harmony cultural activities and trade. All this is inseparable tolerance inter-fraternity. It is this factor which then fosters trade and traffic as well as human goods from China to the archipelago and vice versa.

Selat Panjang and the surrounding area was formerly a territory of the Sultanate of Siak Sri Indrapura which is one of the largest empire in Riau during the reign of Sultan Siak VII of Sultan Sharif Ali Abdul Jalil Assyaidis Syaifuddin Baalawi (who reigned in 1784-1810), usually called Sultan Sharif Ali, gave command to the Commander of Tengku Muda Good Saiyid Thoha to establish the State or the dealer at the Tebing Tinggi Island. In addition to interest on the island as well as the Sultan Sharif Ali Abdul Jalil Assyaidis Syaifuddin Baalawi himself had to stop in the area, the main purpose of Sultan Sharif Ali wanted to gather forces against the kingdom of Sambas (West Kalimantan), which indicated allied with the Dutch, who had betrayed the agreement faithfully and steal the crown Siak kingdom. Country or Bandar as it will spearhead the third defense after the Bukit Batu and Merbau''to confront the invaders and pirates.

Then move the fleet under the Command of Commander in Chief Tengku Muda Saiyid Thoha at the beginning of Muharram in 1805 AD Kingdom of Siak accompanied by some authorities, hundreds of soldiers and Balang upstream toward the island of High Cliff. They arrived at the cliff Forest Alai (now the Capital District of West Tebingtinggi). Commander immediately stabbing keris greets Alai. Ground Alai Land did not answer, he scooped up a handful of land, was hot. He took it off, "According to all the knowledge den, the soil is not good Alai made a country because of land Forest land Alai is a male, could develop into a new country in a period of time," said the commander in front of a magnifying Siak and his men.

Commander of the departed along the coast of this island. Then, it looks a high cliff. "This is the hell is meant by the father of Sultan Sharif Ali," he thought. Fleet docked to Cliff High Land coincide date April 7, 1805 AD. At age was 25 years, with say bismillah Commander soared into the high ground while greeting. "Alha-mdulillah high ground is answering greetings den," he said. Land on take it, feels cool and comfortable. He plugs in dagger on the ground (roughly its current location near the office complex Selatpanjang Customs). As I said, "Hear ye the land by the Forest High Cliff is a very well established a country. This country will develop safe and prosperous when leaders and citizens fairly and work hard and obey the laws of God. "

Commander was standing in front of all the royal princes, soldiers, upstream Balang, and inner-inner around the island. "Den Bagus Saiyid Thoha named Tengku Panglima Besar Muda Siak Sri Indrapura. Kris den is named Lightning Open Sunscreen Natural State. That this figure den den Affairs Makmur Kencana Bandar called the High Cliff. "Origin of the town's name Selatpanjang.

After the cutting of forests, open areas of power, stood the palace of the great commander. In 1810 AD Sultan Sharif Ali Muda Tengku Panglima Besar Saiyid Thoha as ruler of the island. At that time, east of the country bordering the River Suir and the west is bordered by the River Perumbi, as the development time is increasingly crowded airports and grow as a commercial port in the empire siak.

Bustling trade interaction of coastal areas of Riau's the reason for the Dutch East Indies government participated in the determination of the name of this country. History was recorded during the 11th Sultan of Siak Sultan Hashim Abdul Jalil Assayaidis Syarief Syaifuddin. In 1880, the government in the High Cliff State Makmur Kencana dominated by JM Tengkoe Soelong Tjantik Saijet Alwi who holds a Master Tomonggong Marhum Tail (Head of State who is responsible to the Sultan of Siak). During his reign at this airport there was a polemic with the Dutch Colonial Government is Konteliur Van Huis about changing the name of this country, in the Dutch colonial government unilaterally changed the area into Selatpanjang, but not approved by JM Tengkoe Soelong Tjantik Saijet Alwi as local stakeholders. Finally, based on mutual agreement on September 4, 1899, High Cliff State Kencana Makmur Airport turns into State Tebingtinggi Selatpanjang.JM Tengkoe Soelong Tjantik Saijet Alwi died in 1908. Over time the beginning of the Government of the Republic of Indonesia, selatpanjang city and surrounding area is under Bengkalis Regency Kewedanan which then changed status to Tebingtinggi. Pada District dated December 19, 2008, selatpanjang and surrounding area was turned into Meranti Islands Regency split away from the Bengkalis Regency with capital Selatpanjang

Economy

The town's main activities are fishing, agriculture, timber and retail. Selat Panjang has a small port with limited capacity.  Electricity supply is not yet optimal. The people of the area are largely dependent on water transport, still often using dugouts to get around. However, both oil and natural gas have been found in Tebing Tinggi and the neighboring Padang and Merbau Islands. The TA field is close to Selat Panjang. New sago plantings were started in the region on peat soils in 1989, with US$2 million per year expected to be invested the crop.

Hotels
Star Hotels in Selat Panjang, among others:

Tourism
 Cultural attractions in Selatpanjang

 Hoo Ann Kiong Temple (護安宮)

Sister Cities

References

Populated places in Riau
Regency seats of Riau